Sepak takraw was contested at the 1998 Asian Games in Bangkok, Thailand from 9 to 19 December by both men and women, with all games taking place at Indoor Stadium Huamark.

Medalists

Men

Women

Medal table

Participating nations

References

Results

External links
 1998 Asian Games website

 
1998 Asian Games events
1998